The 2008–09 Liga Femenina de Baloncesto was the 46th edition of the Spanish premier championship for women's basketball teams. Ros Casares Valencia defeated Perfumerías Avenida in the final to win its third title in a row, an overall sixth. Rivas Ecópolis also qualified for the FIBA Euroleague along with Ros Casares and Avenida, while Feve San José, Espanyol Olesa and EBE Puig d'en Valls qualified for the FIBA Eurocup. On the other hand, Mann Filter Zaragoza and Extrugasa Cortegada were relegated as the two bottom teams. However, Feve San José was disbanded following the end of the season and Espanyol Olesa renounced to its Eurocup place for financial reasons, so Mann Filter Zaragoza was spared from relegation and invited to the Eurocup along with CB Islas Canarias.

Teams by autonomous community

Regular season

Championship play-offs

Semifinals

Rivas Ecópolis qualifies for the FIBA Euroleague. Feve San José qualifies for the FIBA Eurocup. However, Feve San José later disappeared and was replaced by CB Islas Canarias.

Final

FIBA Eurocup play-offs

Espanyol Olesa and EBE Puig d'en Valls qualify for the FIBA Eurocup. However, Espanyol Olesa later renounced and was replaced by Mann Filter Zaragoza.

References

Liga Femenina de Baloncesto seasons
Femenina
Spain
Liga